Ted Robinson may refer to:

Ted Robinson (golf course architect) (1923–2008), American golf course architect
Ted Robinson (sportscaster) (born 1957), American sportscaster
Ted Robinson (TV director) (born 1944), Australian television director/producer 
Ted Robinson (footballer) (1903–1972), English footballer with Southampton, Southport and Wigan Athletic
Ted Robinson (football manager), manager of Wrexham F.C. from 1912 to 1924
Ted Robinson (American football) (1904–?), American college football player and coach

See also
Edward Robinson (disambiguation)
Theodore Robinson (disambiguation)